Prince Paul of Württemberg (Paul Heinrich Karl Friedrich August; 19 January 1785 – 16 April 1852) was the fourth child and second son of King Frederick I and his wife, Duchess Augusta of Brunswick-Wolfenbüttel.

Early life
Paul was born in St. Petersburg during a period when his father, not yet the ruler of Württemberg, was made governor of Old Finland by Catherine the Great in Russia. The couple had traveled to Russia to visit Frederick's sister Sophie, who was married to the heir to the Russian throne, the Tsesarevich Paul. Prince Paul's parents separated shortly after his birth. The marriage was unhappy, and there were allegations of abusive treatment of his mother. His mother was granted asylum by Catherine the Great and never returned to Württemberg. She died in exile in Koluvere, Estonia, in 1788. In 1797, Frederick married Charlotte, Princess Royal, eldest daughter of King George III of the United Kingdom, who supervised the education of Paul and his two surviving siblings, Wilhelm and Catharina. Charlotte regarded Paul as "a very comical boy and, in my partial eyes, his manners are like Adolphus [Charlotte's younger brother]."

As Paul grew up, her opinion changed. During the visit of the Allied sovereigns to London in 1814, Paul, along with many other princes, was taken to visit the Ascot races by the Prince Regent. He behaved badly and got the Prince of Orange blind drunk. "For thirteen years he has done nothing but offend his father with the improprieties of his conduct", his stepmother wrote.

First marriage and children
On 28 September 1805 in Ludwigsburg, Paul married Princess Charlotte of Saxe-Hildburghausen, second daughter of Frederick, Duke of Saxe-Hildburghausen, who became Duke of Saxe-Altenburg in 1826.  They had five children:

 Princess Friederike Charlotte Marie (9 January 1807 – 2 February 1873); married Grand Duke Michael Pavlovich of Russia
 Prince Frederick Karl August (21 February 1808 – 9 May 1870); married his cousin Princess Catherine Frederica of Württemberg and was the father of William II of Württemberg.
 Paul Friedrich (7 March 1809 – 28 May 1810)
 Princess Pauline Friederike Marie (25 February 1810 – 7 July 1856); married William, Duke of Nassau; mother of Sophia of Nassau, wife of Oscar II of Sweden and Norway.  Through Pauline, Paul is an ancestor of the present Belgian, Danish, Dutch, Norwegian, and Swedish royal families, and the Grand Ducal Family of Luxembourg.
 Prince August (24 January 1813 – 12 January 1885); married (morganatically) Marie Bethge, with issue.

Illegitimate descendants
Shortly before his marriage, Paul had a mistress, an actress named Friederike Margarethe Porth (22 August 1776, Halberstadt - 9 June 1860, Frankfurt am Main). Friederike was the daughter of Johann Carl Porth (1748, Barchwitz, Silesia  - 18 June 1794, Weimar) and his wife, Caroline (c. 1752 - died after 1797, Weimar). Paul and Friederike had a daughter baptized Adelheid Pauline Karoline, usually called Karoline, marrying later as Karoline von Rottenburg (28 November 1805, Frankfurt am Main - 13 February 1872, Frankfurt am Main). On 16 February 1836, in Augsburg, Karoline married Freiherr Karl Pfeffel von Kriegelstein (22 November 1811, Dresden -  25 January 1890, Munich). Through his daughter Karoline, Prince Paul is an ancestor of British Prime Minister Boris Johnson.

Later life and second marriage
In 1815 Paul moved from his home in Stuttgart to Paris, leaving his wife and two sons, but taking his daughters with him. There he led a relatively modest life, but was frequently in the company of intellectuals such as Georges Cuvier. Paul's family did not approve of this and ordered him to return to Württemberg, but he refused. While in Paris, he fathered two more illegitimate daughters by two different mistresses.

Shortly after the death of his wife in 1847, Paul went to England with his long-term mistress Magdalena Fausta Angela Creus y soler, of Menorcan origin, the widow of Sir Sandford Whittingham KCB, and they were married in the Parish Church of St Nicholas, Brighton, Sussex, on 26 April 1848. She died in Paris, 27 December 1852. Their daughter Pauline Madeleine Ximenes, who had been born in Paris on 3 March 1825, was created Countess von Helfenstein in 1841. So far it has not been disclosed who had conferred upon her the aristocratic title of "von Rottenburg". Pauline married Count Gustave de Monttessuy in Paris on 24 August 1843 and died in Paris on 24 February 1905.

Paul died in Paris aged 67 on 16 April 1852.

Honours
 :
 Grand Cross of the Württemberg Crown
 Knight of the Military Merit Order
  French Empire: Grand Eagle of the Legion of Honour, 1805/06
 : Knight of St. Hubert, 1808
  Kingdom of Prussia: Knight of the Black Eagle, 3 November 1812

Ancestry

References

Princes of Württemberg
1785 births
1852 deaths
Members of the Württembergian Chamber of Lords
Grand Croix of the Légion d'honneur
Sons of kings